is a manga imprint owned by Square Enix. It publishes manga in several magazines aimed at different reader demographic groups in the Japanese market. Its magazines are home to some popular Square Enix manga series which were adapted into anime series, like Fullmetal Alchemist, Moribito: Guardian of the Spirit, Nabari no Ou, Inu x Boku SS, and Soul Eater. This list contains notable manga franchises published by Gangan.

Manga and anime franchises owned by Square Enix

Square Enix manga with no anime

 I Think Our Son Is Gay

See also
 List of Japanese role-playing game franchises

Notes

References

Gangan manga franchises
Square Enix manga
Lists of media franchises